Cedric Decorrus Jones (born June 1, 1960) is a former wide receiver who played nine professional seasons with the National Football League (NFL)'s New England Patriots. He was drafted by the Patriots with the 56th overall pick in the third round of the 1982 NFL Draft, and played college football at Duke.

College career

Duke 
Cedric Jones played football for the Blue Devils from 1978–81, where he had an outstanding career. Jones finished his college career with 99 catches for 1,732 yards and 21 touchdowns, with 42 receptions for 832 yards and 10 touchdowns coming during his senior season. Not only was his senior season remarkable statistically, he also served as captain of the team, received team MVP, All-ACC honors, and second-team All-America. Represented Duke in the prestigious Senior Bowl following his senior season.

He led the ACC in receiving yardage in 1981 and, as a sophomore, returned a kickoff 97 yards for a touchdown versus Wake Forest.  The top receiving yardage game of his career came on October 24, 1981 against Maryland when he caught six passes for 183 yards and two touchdowns. 

He graduated from Duke in 1982 with degrees in history and political science.

Professional career 
Jones played his entire 9 year career with the Patriots. He helped lead the Patriots to an appearance in Super Bowl XX. His best season came in 1989 when he caught 48 balls for 670 yards (14 yards per catch) and 6 touchdowns. Jones finished his career with 191 receptions for 2,703 yards and 16 touchdowns.  He also contributed occasionally on special teams, returning 14 kickoffs throughout his career.

Personal life 
After his NFL career Jones worked for 3 years as the NFL's Director of Senior Director Consumer Products/On Field Operations, and 3 years as the NFL's Senior Director for Youth Football. He is currently the Athletic Director for the New York Athletic Club in New York City.

References

External links
NFL.com player page

1960 births
Living people
Players of American football from Norfolk, Virginia
American football wide receivers
Duke Blue Devils football players
New England Patriots players